Elections to Tower Hamlets London Borough Council were held on 9 May 1968.  The whole council was up for election. Turnout was 14.3%.

Until 1978, each London council had aldermen, in the ratio of one aldermen to six councillors. Tower Hamlets had ten aldermen. Following the elections, Tower Hamlets elected five aldermen, who served until 1974. The remaining five aldermen had been elected in 1964 and would serve until 1971. All aldermen on Tower Hamlets were Labour.

Election result

|}

Ward results

References

1968
1968 London Borough council elections
20th century in the London Borough of Tower Hamlets